A Royal Divorce is a 1923 British silent historical drama film directed by Alexander Butler and starring Gwylim Evans, Gertrude McCoy and Lillian Hall-Davis.  It was based on a play by C.C. Collingham and depicts the romantic relationship and political divorce between Napoleon and his wife Josephine. It reportedly did well at the box office when released in the United States, possibly reflecting the strategy of casting an American star McCoy in a leading role. It was remade as a sound film, A Royal Divorce, in 1938.

Cast
 Gwylim Evans as Napoleon
 Gertrude McCoy as Josephine
 Lillian Hall-Davis as Stephanie
 Gerald Ames as Marques de Beaumont
 Mary Dibley as Marie-Louise
 Jerrold Robertshaw as Talleyrand
 Tom Reynolds as Grimand
 Mercy Peters as King of Rome

References

Bibliography
 Low, Rachael. The History of British Film, Volume 4 1918-1929. Routledge, 1997.
 Street, Sarah. Transatlantic Crossings: British Feature Films in the USA. A&C Black, 2002.

External links
 

1923 films
British silent feature films
British historical drama films
1920s historical drama films
Films directed by Alexander Butler
Films about Napoleon
Cultural depictions of Joséphine de Beauharnais
Cultural depictions of Charles Maurice de Talleyrand-Périgord
British black-and-white films
1923 drama films
1920s English-language films
1920s British films
Silent drama films